A transplant surgeon is a surgeon who performs organ transplants. Among the many organs that can be transplanted are: kidneys, livers, hearts, lungs, the pancreas, the intestine (especially the small intestine), and recently, faces, tracheal (windpipe) tissue, and penises.

Medical training

Training in the U.S. involves the four years of the undergraduate education, four years of medical school, five years of general surgery residency, followed by a two year fellowship in transplant surgery.

Notable Surgeons 

 Thomas Starzl - first human liver transplants. Often quoted as the “father of modern transplantation”
 Theodor Kocher - first modern transplant
 James D. Hardy - first successful lung transplant 
 Bruce Reitz - first successful heart-lung transplant
Patrick Soon Shiong - first encapsulated human islet transplant

See also
 Transplant surgery

References

 
Health care occupations